His Honour Percy Lionel Edwin Rawlins (14 April 1902 – 27 April 1977), was a British judge and Liberal Party politician.

Background
Rawlins was born the son of F.P.F.M. Rawlins, a Solicitor and F. Rawlins. He was educated at Highgate School and Selwyn College, Cambridge. In 1930 he married Katharine M.E. Fearnley-Sander. They had one son and one daughter.

Professional career
Rawlins received a Call to Bar by Gray's Inn in 1926. He was President of the Gray's Inn Debating Society. He was a County Court Judge from 1947–67. He was Circuit judge for No 36 (Berkshire, Gloucestershire & Oxfordshire) from 1962–67.

Political career
Rawlins was Liberal candidate for the Streatham division at the 1929 General Election. Streatham was a safe Unionist seat where the Liberals had come second at the previous election in 1924. He increased the Liberal vote and reduced the Unionist majority. He did not stand for parliament again.

Electoral record

References

1902 births
1977 deaths
Liberal Party (UK) parliamentary candidates
People educated at Highgate School
Alumni of Selwyn College, Cambridge
Members of Gray's Inn
County Court judges (England and Wales)